Rudolf Marti (born 7 April 1950) is a Swiss bobsledder who competed from the mid-1970s to the early 1980s. Competing in two Winter Olympics, he won two silver medals  in the four-man event (1976, 1980).

Marti also won two silver medals in the four-man event at the FIBT World Championships, earning them in 1977 and 1978.

References
 Bobsleigh four-man Olympic medalists for 1924, 1932-56, and since 1964
 Bobsleigh four-man world championship medalists since 1930
 DatabaseOlympics.com profile

1950 births
Bobsledders at the 1976 Winter Olympics
Bobsledders at the 1980 Winter Olympics
Living people
Swiss male bobsledders
Olympic bobsledders of Switzerland
Olympic silver medalists for Switzerland
Olympic medalists in bobsleigh
Medalists at the 1980 Winter Olympics
Medalists at the 1976 Winter Olympics